Oehrenfeld, also Öhrenfeld, is a part of Ilsenburg in Saxony-Anhalt, Germany.

Geography
The Karrberg and Drübeck are located at the northern side of the village. In the east is the village of Darlingerode, also part of Ilsenburg. On the northern Edge of Oehrenfeld is the Rohrteich. In the southwestern part there on a path to Plessenburg is the Harschenhöllenklippe.

History

In 1753/64 the gräfliche Zeughaus was constructed.
Until 30 June 2009 Oehrenfeld was a part of Drübeck. On the 1st July 2009 both were incorporated into Ilsenburg.

References

Villages in Saxony-Anhalt
Ilsenburg